Mrs Worrington's Perfume (German: Das Parfüm der Mrs. Worrington) is a 1925 German silent mystery film directed by Franz Seitz and starring Ernst Reicher, Mary Nolan and Maria Mindzenty. It was part of a series of films featuring the detective Stuart Webbs. It was made at the Emelka Studios near Munich.

The film's art direction was by Ludwig Reiber and Otto Völckers

Cast
 Ernst Reicher as Stuart Webbs, Detektiv  
 Mary Nolan
 Maria Mindzenty as Mabel Christians  
 John Mylong as Dr. Harry Edwards  
 Otto Wernicke as Philipp Worrington  
 Karl Falkenberg as Charles Taylor  
 Ferdinand Martini as Bob Trumm  
 Claire Kronburger
 Manfred Koempel-Pilot as Hubert Mills

References

Bibliography
 Grange, William. Cultural Chronicle of the Weimar Republic. Scarecrow Press, 2008.

External links

1925 films
Films of the Weimar Republic
Films directed by Franz Seitz
German silent feature films
1925 mystery films
German mystery films
Bavaria Film films
Films shot at Bavaria Studios
German black-and-white films
Silent mystery films
1920s German films
1920s German-language films